RS Ophiuchi (RS Oph) is a recurrent nova system approximately 5,000 light-years away in the constellation Ophiuchus. In its quiet phase it has an apparent magnitude of about 12.5. It has been observed to erupt in 1898, 1933, 1958, 1967, 1985, 2006 and 2021 and reached about magnitude 5 on average. A further two eruptions, in 1907 and 1945, have been inferred from archival data. The recurrent nova is produced  by a white dwarf star and a red giant in a binary system. About every 15 years, enough material from the red giant builds up on the surface of the white dwarf to produce a thermonuclear explosion. The white dwarf orbits close to the red giant, with an accretion disc concentrating the overflowing atmosphere of the red giant onto the white dwarf.

Properties

RS Ophiuchi is a system consisting of a white dwarf with a red giant companion. The stars are in a binary system with an orbital period of around 454 days.

Eruptive history
The chart below shows when every recorded nova had occurred since the first confirmed one in the year of 1898.

1898 

The 1898 eruption was, in fact, not discovered until several years after it happened. Williamina Fleming discovered a nova-like spectrum in the Henry Draper Memorial photographs and announced it as a potential nova in 1904. This diagnosis was affirmed by Edward Charles Pickering in 1905, after which Annie Jump Cannon determined that RS Ophiuchi had likely reached maximum in 1898.

1907
Though the 1907 eruption was not observed during outburst, measurements of a dip in brightness from archival observations suggests that RS Oph underwent an eruption in early 1907 during a time when it was obscured by the sun.

1933
The 1933 outburst was first detected by Eppe Loreta, from Bologna, Italy.  Loreta had been observing Y Ophiuchi when he serendipitously noticed a bright object about 50 arcminutes southwest of Y Oph.  The detection of this luminous star resulted in the second recorded outburst of RS Oph.  An independent discovery of this activity was made several days later by Leslie Peltier (P) while making his routine check of the variable.

1945
The 1945 eruption was also inferred from archival data after the outburst as a result of obscuration from the sun during the peak brightness. This eruption is more certain than that in 1907, as the tail of the eruption was also observed.

1958
The 1958 outburst was detected by Cyrus Fernald, located in Longwood, Florida.  Fernald's monthly report for July 1958, containing 345 observations, displays a note in which he comments "Not too good of a month outside of the RS Oph observations (19 in total). It was interesting to watch the change in color as the star faded. It was reddish-yellow the first night, then yellowish-red, and so on. The last observation was the reddest star that I have ever seen." The crimson color of which Fernald speaks is indicative of the strong H-alpha emission displayed in the several days following the outburst.

1967
The 1967 outburst was again detected by Cyrus Fernald (FE), however, Fernald was not given credit for the earliest observation of maximum.  For on the same evening, Dr. Max Beyer (BY), located in Hamburg, Germany, observed the variable at 6th magnitude. Due to the 6-hour difference in time zones, Dr. Beyer was credited with the first report.

1985
In January 1985, Warren Morrison of Peterborough, Canada discovered RS Oph to again be in outburst, reaching a maximum brightness of magnitude 5.4.

2006
On 12 February 2006 a new outburst occurred, reaching magnitude 4.5. The opportunity was taken to observe it at different wavelengths.
It was notably observed with the VLTI by Olivier Chesneau, who discovered an elongated fireball as early as 5.5 days after the explosion (see the figure below). Silicate dust and SiO emissions were observed after eruptuon.

2021 
On 8 August 2021, the Brazilian amateur astronomer Alexandre Amorim, from Florianópolis, Brazil detected a new outburst of RS Oph at 21:55 UT and sent a notification to AAVSO. The outbust was confirmed by an independent observation of Keith Geary from Ireland at 22:20 UT. The Fermi Gamma Ray Space Telescope corroborated optical observations made by Amorim and Geary of a new outburst associated with RS Oph, with an estimated visual magnitude of 5.0. It reached a peak visual magnitude of approximately 4.6 the following day.

References

Bibliography

External links

 
 Entry at Astronomy Picture of the Day
 Entry in the Variable Star Index
 AAVSO

Recurrent novae
Ophiuchus (constellation)
M-type giants
Ophiuchi, RS
162214
Durchmusterung objects